The Matrix: Original Motion Picture Score is one of the two 1999 soundtrack albums from the film, The Matrix (the other being The Matrix: Music from the Motion Picture).

The Region 1 single disc DVD release (September 21, 1999) contained an isolated score track, including commentary by Davis.

Track listing
 Main Title / Trinity Infinity (3:54)
 Unable To Speak (1:15)
 The Power Plant (2:41)
 Welcome To The Real World (2:28)
 The Hotel Ambush (5:23)
 Exit Mr. Hat (1:23)
 A Virus (1:33)
 Bullet-Time (1:10)
 Ontological Shock (3:32)
 Anything Is Possible (6:48)

The Deluxe Edition
In September 2008, Varèse Sarabande released an expanded to 78 minutes version of the score, that was limited to 3000 copies.

Track listing
 Main Title / Trinity Infinity (3:49)
 Neo On The Edge (3:23)
 Unable To Speak (1:13)
 Bait and Switch (3:15)
 Switched for Life (3:35)
 Switched At Birth (2:40)
 Switch's Brew (2:26)
 Cold Hearted Switch (1:38)
 Nascent Nauseous Neo (2:05)
 A Morpheus Moment (1:30)
 Bow Whisk Orchestra (1:03)
 Domo Showdown (1:14)
 Switch Or Break Show (1:04)
 Shake, Borrow, Switch (:33)
 Freeze Face (1:48)
 Switch Woks Her Boa (2:03)
 Switch Out (2:56)
 Boon Spoy (1:06)
 Oracle Cookies (1:26)
 Threat Mix (5:24)
 Exit Mr. Hat (1:16)
 On Your Knees, Switch (4:45)
 Mix The Art (1:27)
 Whoa, Switch Brokers (4:01)
 No More Spoons (1:00)
 Dodge This (1:06)
 Ontological Shock (3:29)
 That's Gotta Hurt (5:16)
 Surprise! (4:04)
 He's The One Alright (6:47)

Composed, orchestrated and conducted by Don Davis. Performed by The Hollywood Studio Symphony.

The Complete Edition 
In June 2021, Varèse Sarabande issued a further expanded version of the score on CD and SACD. This was also released on vinyl in July 2021.

References

The Matrix (franchise) albums
1999 soundtrack albums
1990s film soundtrack albums
Film scores
Varèse Sarabande soundtracks
Don Davis (composer) soundtracks